Carlos Moreno Laguillo (born in Mexico) is a Mexican telenovelas producer.

Filmography

Awards and nominations

Premios TVyNovelas

Premios ACE

Premios People en Español

References

External links

Living people
Mexican telenovela producers
Place of birth missing (living people)
Year of birth missing (living people)
Mexican television producers